"I Can't Be with You" is a song recorded by Irish band the Cranberries. It was the third single from their second studio album, No Need to Argue (1994), except in North America, where it was released as the fourth and final single of the album. The song achieved minor chart success in most of the European countries where it was released, peaking at number 21 in their native Ireland. In Iceland, the song reached number one for a week in April 1995, becoming the Cranberries' third consecutive number-one single there.

Critical reception
Chuck Campbell from Knoxville News Sentinel felt "I Can't Be with You" "is a mundane pining-away song". In his weekly UK chart commentary, James Masterton complimented it as "another epic single" from the Cranberries, adding that O'Riordan's yodelling "sounds as hauntingly lovely as ever".

Music video
The accompanying music video to "I Can't Be with You" was directed by Samuel Bayer who was also the director of several of the band's other hit singles: "Zombie", "Ode to My Family", and "Ridiculous Thoughts". The video shows lead singer Dolores O'Riordan wearing 1920s clothing, kneeling beside a bed and bathing a child in a small bathtub. She then appears walking through desolate buildings and streets with a wooden torch with an old man dressed as an angel often lurking in the background. Throughout the video the band is seen playing in grassland while wearing red suits. At the end of the video, the old man returns to the location where he was seen at the beginning of the clip. Parts of the video was filmed at Copped Hall in Epping.

Track listings
 7-inch single
 "I Can't Be with You"		
 "(They Long to Be) Close to You" (Burt Bacharach, Hal David)		

 CD single
 "I Can't Be with You"		
 "(They Long to Be) Close to You"
 "Empty" (live on BBC Radio One FM Evening Session, 26 September 1994)

 Limited-edition CD single
 "I Can't Be with You"	(live on BBC Radio One FM Evening Session, 26 September 1994)	
 "Zombie" (acoustic)
 "Daffodil Lament" (live at Feile, Tipperary, 30 July 1994)

 Australian CD single (cardboard sleeve)
 "I Can't Be with You"
 "Empty" (live on BBC Radio One FM Evening Session, 26 September 1994)
 "I Can't Be with You"	(live on BBC Radio One FM Evening Session, 26 September 1994)

Personnel
 Dolores O'Riordan – vocals, keyboards
 Noel Hogan – electric and acoustic guitars
 Mike Hogan – bass guitar
 Fergal Lawler – drums

Charts

Weekly charts

Year-end charts

References

1995 singles
1994 songs
The Cranberries songs
Music videos directed by Samuel Bayer
Number-one singles in Iceland
Song recordings produced by Stephen Street
Songs written by Dolores O'Riordan
Songs written by Noel Hogan